Larry A. Nagahara, of the National Cancer Institute, was awarded the status of Fellow in the American Physical Society, after he was nominated by their Topical Group on Instrument and Measurement Science  in 2008, for his pioneering work in developing scanning probe microscopy and other nanotechnology platforms for the analysis, manipulation and measurements at the nanoscale and of molecular components and for the elucidation of the fundamental physical principles underlying these systems.

Since 2016, Nagahara has served as the Associate Dean of Research at Johns Hopkins University's G.W.C. Whiting School of Engineering.

References 

Fellows of the American Physical Society
American physicists
Living people
University of California, Davis alumni
Year of birth missing (living people)